Rocky: The Revenge also simply known as Rocky is a 2019 Indian Tamil-language crime thriller film written and directed by Bollywood filmmaker K. C. Bokadia in his Tamil directorial debut. The film stars two German Shepherd dogs as central titular characters with Srikanth and Eshanya Maheshwari. The film's story is loosely based on the 1985 film Teri Meherbaniyan which is itself remake of 1984 Kannada film Thaliya Bhagya. This film was partially re-shot in Telugu as Namaste Nestama.

Plot 
The movie begins with a few animal smugglers entering a bungalow and stealing two German shepherd puppies. While on the way, the door of the van opens, and one of the puppies falls down. ACP Santhosh (Srikanth), who rescues the pup, takes it to his house. He and his wife (Eshanya Maheshwari) name it Rocky and send it to a police dog training school. A few years later, the fully trained Rocky returns home. Meanwhile, Santhosh is at loggerheads with the local MLA Thenappan (Sayaji Shinde). Santhosh arrests Paandi (OAK Sundar), the henchman of Thenappan, on a weapon smuggling case and puts him behind bars. An irked Thenappan waits for a chance to kill Santhosh and bumps him off; the eyewitness to the murder is Rocky. The rest is all about how Rocky avenges the death of his master.

Cast 
 Two German Shepherd dogs as Rocky
 Srikanth as ACP Santhosh
 Eshanya Maheshwari as Santhosh's wife
 Sayaji Shinde as MLA Thenappan
 Nassar as Police Commissioner P. Selvam
 OAK Sundar as Paandi 
 Brahmanandam as Dog Trainer
 Karate Raja as Police Officer
 Thagubothu Ramesh 
 Chammak Chandra

Production 
The venture was announced by a prominent figure in the Bollywood industry K. C Bokadia in 2018, who has produced in excess of 50 Hindi films in his career, this film marked his directorial debut in Tamil cinema. The portions of the film were shot and set in Chennai, Hyderabad, Mumbai, Jaipur, Jaisalmer, Udaipur and Kulu Manali.

Soundtrack 
The songs were composed by Bappi Lahiri.
Track listing
"Sanjari" - Hariharan, Sreedhip, Naina Nayar
"Ulley Ulley" - Jeanath, Monika

Telugu 
"Bangaru" - Hariharan, Sreedhip, Naina Nayar
"Dil Se" - Jeanath, Monika

Plea 
The filmmakers were made aware of a plea at the Madras High Court regarding the change of film title during early April 2019. The plea suggested to not to use the term Rocky in the film title as another completed Tamil film which is on the frontline to have its theatrical release also possess the same name. The filmmakers initially announced the film title as Rocky before commencing principal photography, and then after the conclusion of the filmmaking, the director renamed the title as Rocky The Hero for a temporal reason. However, the teaser of the film revealed the title as Rocky The Revenge.

Release 
The film released to negative reviews.

A critic from The Times of India opined that "The story is what 80s staple revenge dramas are made of and could have worked in today’s time had a little more attention been paid to the narration". A critic from the Deccan Chronicle noted that "Had the director concentrated on a tauter screenplay keeping the present scenario in mind, the film would have been more palatable". Regarding the Telugu version titled Namaste Nestama, a critic from 123 Telugu wrote "On the whole, Namaste Nesthama is a very old school revenge drama that has nothing going its way."

References

External links 

2019 films
2010s Tamil-language films
Indian action thriller films
Indian crime thriller films
Indian police films
Films about dogs
Films shot in Chennai
Films shot in Mumbai
Tamil remakes of Kannada films
Tamil remakes of Hindi films
Fictional portrayals of the Tamil Nadu Police
Indian films about revenge
Films directed by K. C. Bokadia
2019 action thriller films
2019 crime thriller films
2010s police films
Indian multilingual films